A connector is a highway or freeway road that connects to another highway or freeway. It can be part of an interchange such as the MacArthur Maze or a longer roadway such as the  Interstate 635.

A connector route is a type of special route or supplemental route in the United States that serves as a connector, connecting one route to a more prominent route. Connector routes are found among the United States Numbered Highways and among some state route systems like Michigan and Nebraska.

Connector routes can also be designated as a routing between two numbered highways. Examples include:
 Connector M-44, which runs along Plainfield Avenue between Interstate 96 and M-44 north of Grand Rapids, Michigan.
 Pearl Harbor Memorial Turnpike Extension (also known as the Pennsylvania Turnpike Connector), which connects the New Jersey Turnpike with the Delaware River extension of the Pennsylvania Turnpike.

Types of roads